Mesa Vista can refer to:

Mesa Vista, California, a town
Sharp Mesa Vista Hospital, a psychiatric hospital